The Very Best of En Vogue is a 2001 greatest hits album by En Vogue, containing hits from their three studio albums, Born to Sing, Funky Divas, and EV3.

Track listing

Credits
Lead Vocal, Backing Vocal: Terry Ellis, Dawn Robinson, Cindy Herron, Maxine Jones
Producer: Kenneth "Babyface" Edmonds (tracks: 8)
Producer: Ivan Matias, Organized Noize (tracks: 4)
Producer: Hurby "luvbug" Azor (tracks: 6)
Producer: Denzil Foster and Thomas McElroy

References

2001 greatest hits albums
En Vogue compilation albums
Elektra Records compilation albums